The Subprefecture of São Miguel Paulista is one of 32 subprefectures of the city of São Paulo, Brazil.  It comprises three districts: São Miguel Paulista, Jardim Helena, and Vila Jacuí.

References

Subprefectures of São Paulo